Chandrakala S. Kammath (also spelled as Chandrakala S. Kamath) is a Malayalam language writer from Kerala, India. She is the author of several novels. Her novel Rugma has made into a movie. Sreekumaran Thampi has serialized her novels Bhiksha and Sapatni. Writing novels and stories since last 40 years, her last published novel is Sumangala. In 2014, for outstanding contributions in the field of Malayalam literature, she has been awarded Kerala Sahitya Akademi Award for Overall contribution.

Biography
Chandrakala was born into a wealthy Gowda Saraswat Brahmin family in Alappuzha in 1940. Konkani is her mother tongue. Her father Sreeramachandra Shenoy was an agent in a private bank. When the bank collapsed, her father joined as manager in a timber company in Coimbatore, but soon he lost that job and came home jobless. As the family was gone financially backward, she completed her education with the help of her uncles. After graduation, she got job as a teacher first in a private school and later in a government high school.

Chandrakala married her uncle's son who was working as a National Savings Officer in the Kollam Collectorate. After marriage she gone to Kollam from Alappuzha. They have two children.

After her husband's death, based on her own experiences, Chandrakala wrote an article titled Kungumappottazhinju and sent it to Vanitha magazine. It attracted a lot of readers, and Pisharody, who was the editor of Vanitha at the time, wrote her "You have good linguistic influence, and the writing is also good. you should continue to write stories, novels and articles. Even though not your mother tongue, your Malayalam is better". This was her inspiration to write stories and novels. In an occasion honoring her, Poet Chavara K. S. Pillai said that Chandrakala was a brave and rare writer who fought against customs from the hearth of experience.

Chandrakala has written 16 novels and more than forty short stories. Agnihotram is her first published story. Her novels and short stories were published in Manorajyam, Kunkumam and Vanitha. Chandrakala's first novel Rugma was made into a Malayalam film by P. G. Viswambharan with the same name. Sreekumaran Thampi has serialized her novel Bhiksha under the title Akshayapathram. He also serialized the novel Sapatni.

Selected works

Bhiksha (novel)
Sapatni (novel), 2004  

Ivide Oru Thanal Maram (novel)
Agnihothram(novel)

Muthassi Ramayanam (it's English translation is published under the titleGrandma's Rāmāyaṇa and Hindi translation under the title Ramayan Ki Kahani Dadi Ki Zubhani), Children's literature

Awards and honors
 Kerala Sahitya Akademi Award for Overall Contributions 2014.

References

Malayalam-language writers
Indian women novelists
Indian women short story writers
1940 births
Living people
People from Alappuzha district